Coley is a surname. Notable people with the surname include:

Andre Coley (born 1974), Jamaican cricketer
Andy Coley (born 1978), British rugby league player
Craig Coley (born 1947), American wrongfully convicted of murder
Doris Coley (1941–2000), American singer with The Shirelles
Henry Coley (1633–1704), English astrologer
John Ford Coley (born 1948), American singer and musician
Stacy Coley (born 1994), American football player
Trevon Coley (born 1994), American football player
William Coley (1862–1936), American surgeon and cancer researcher

See also
Coley (disambiguation)
Colley (disambiguation)